Jasmine Dubé (born April 11, 1957) is a Canadian actor, writer and director living in Quebec.

She was born in Amqui, studied at the Cégep de Matane and graduated from the National Theatre School of Canada in 1978. In 1984, she performed in 's one-women show  Caméléonne. She wrote her first play Bouches décousues in 1992.

She writes scripts for theatre, mainly for young audiences, and for television, as well as fiction for young people. Her work has been translated into English, Portuguese and Italian. She has developed scripts for a number of television series including Passe-Partout,  and Michou et Pilo.

From 1985 to 1991, she wrote a column on theatre for the literary magazine Lurelu.

Dubé is co-founder and artistic director for Théâtre Bouches Décousues. In 2005, this company received the grand prize of the Conseil des arts de Montréal for its contribution to local theatre.

She has received a number of awards including:

Her works have also been finalists several times for the Governor General's Literary Awards.

Her play Petit monstre received an award for best production from the Association québécoise des critiques de théâtre and was a finalist for a Governor General's Award.

References 

1957 births
Living people
20th-century Canadian actresses
20th-century Canadian dramatists and playwrights
20th-century Canadian screenwriters
20th-century Canadian women writers
21st-century Canadian actresses
21st-century Canadian dramatists and playwrights
21st-century Canadian screenwriters
21st-century Canadian women writers
Canadian stage actresses
Canadian women dramatists and playwrights
Canadian women screenwriters
Canadian women children's writers
Canadian television writers
Canadian dramatists and playwrights in French
Canadian screenwriters in French
Canadian children's writers in French
Canadian women television writers